Phraya Phichai, or popularly known as Phraya Phichai Dap Hak (th: พระยาพิชัยดาบหัก; lit: Phraya Phichai of the broken sword) (1741 – 1782) was a historic Siamese nobleman of Mon birth who served as a military leader under King Taksin of Thonburi. He legendarily became known for fighting with a sword in each hand until one was broken.

Background
Phraya Phichai was a Siamese general serving under King Taksin. After the fall of Ayutthaya in 1767, Phraya Phichai and Chao Phraya Chakri (who later become the first King of Chakri dynasty) followed Phraya Taksin in repelling the Burmese and reuniting Siam. They were considered Phraya Taksin's left and right hands.

In 1782, King Taksin showed signs of mental illness. At that time, the nation still lacked stability and was in need of a strong ruler. King Taksin was deposed and later executed following a coup, after which Chao Phraya Chakri took the throne . Phraya Phichai, a devout follower of King Taksin, was not spared, and by most account, requested for his own execution to follow King Taksin to his death. He was executed soon after.

He gained the name Phraya Phichai Dap Hak or Phraya Phichai Broken Sword in a battle in which he kept fighting (and won) even after one of his blades (daab) was broken in half.

Early life

Birth
Phraya Phichai was born in 1741 at Ban Huai Kha, Phichai, Uttaradit Province, having four brothers and sisters but three of them died before Phichai"s birth. His parents were unknown. His birthname was Choi (th: จ้อย; means: the little one).

Childhood

When Choi was a young boy, he loved to practice Thai boxing and would always be running away without his parents knowing, to train in the art. He trained with many teachers of that time.

One day, Choi left home northernwards and met with a boxing instructor named Thiang (th: เที่ยง) at Wat Ban Kaeng (th: วัดบ้านแก่ง). Choi then became a beloved student of Instructor Thiang and was renamed Thong Di, his instructor called him as Thong Di Fan Khao (means: Thong Di whose teeth are white) as he did not chew betel nut. The Thai people loved chewing betel nut, which made their teeth black, since the ancient time until the Government under the premiership of Field Marshal Plaek Phibunsongkhram issued a ban on chewing the nut in 1942.

Career

Serving the Crown
One day, Phraya Tak (later to become King Taksin the Great of the Thonburi kingdom) was holding a boxing contest in the city of Tak during a traditional festival. Now a young man of twenty years, Thong Di asked the ring master to find him a match. The towns people having never seen the boxer before suggested that he take an opponent who had little experience so that it would make an exciting fight, but Thong Di insisted that he would fight the most skillful boxer in the town.

A famous boxing master of Tak, Nai Hao, who nobody dared to challenge, gladly agreed to take the fight. A huge crowd gathered to see the young boxer Thong Di fight the invincible Nai Hao. Throughout the bout Thong Di showed brilliant Thai boxing style.

Seeing a resounding victory over Nai Hao after witnessing such a formidable display, Phraya Tak showed no hesitation in asking Thong Di to join his army. Thong Di were very pleasing to Phraya Tak who appointed him to be his personal bodyguard.

Commander-in-Chief
The Emperor of China Qianlong, was alarmed by the military might of the Burmese. From 1765 to 1769, the Emperor sent his armies four times to subdue the Burmese, but all four invasions failed. Siam was under the control of the Burmese since the sacking of Ayutthaya in 1767, but the Burmese had to withdraw the bulk of garrison army from Siam to ward of the Chinese invasions, leaving behind only a small contingent. Phraya Tak taking advantage of the situation, organized his men into an army and drove back the Burmese force.

Phraya Tak started off as a guerrilla leader with only five hundred followers. But within a decade the Siamese Kingdom was reborn and grew into an empire that subdued both Laos and Cambodia under its dominion. During the independence war, Phraya Tak managed to escape to Rayong on the East coast of Siam. Here with the help of Thong Di, now his Commander-in-Chief, raised an army and declared all out war on Burma. The action was to eventually regain freedom for the Siamese people.

Thong Di, under the guidance of Phraya Tak and using guerrilla tactics, won back many small towns and villages from the Burmese. It was during one of the many battles, that Thong Di was to become famous. In 1773, a Burmese army under the command of Ne Myo Thihapate was sent to capture the City of Phichai. Thong Di led the Siamese army and fought him at Wat Aka and Chao Phraya Surasi helped him battle the Burmese. The Burmese general was driven back and retreated with heavy casualties.

The One with Broken Sword
In the heat of the battle which Thong Di fought with daab song mue (two handed swords) and after many fierce engagements he slipped and used one of his swords to control himself by pointing it into the ground, as he leaned on the sword it broke in half. Thong Di used his Thai boxing techniques. One dap and one broken one, he led his army to victory forcing the Burmese back across the border.

As a result of this battle he was known as "Phraya Phichai Dap Hak". Eventually after fifteen years of war the Siamese under king Taksin had forced the Burmese army back and Siam regained all of its original frontiers.

Death and legacy
When King Taksin died in 1782, the new King Rama I of the Chakri dynasty (the present day rulers), declared his new capital Bangkok. As a reward for his loyalty and service to his country King Rama asked Phraya Phichai if he would continue his good work as the king's guard. (In these times the law of the land stated that once a King died, his bodyguards and loyal servants should die with him, but King Rama offered to take an exception for Phraya Phichai.)

However, Phraya Phichai was so saddened by the death of his beloved King Taksin that he ordered the executioner to do away with him, despite King Rama's kindness. Such was the loyalty that Phraya Phichai had for King Taksin. Instead he asked King Rama to raise his son and in time that son could become King's personal bodyguard in his father's place.

Phraya Phichai was executed on his own order when he was 41 years old. A monument built to the memory of Phraya Phichai in 1969. The bronze image of the great warrior stand proudly in front of the Parliament Building in Uttaradit and serves to remind each generation of the amazing man's courage and loyalty to his King and the Thai nation. The epitaph reads "In memory and loving honor for the pride of our nation".

In popular culture
 Thong Dee Fun Khao (film) is an action movie about Phraya Phichai, the story based in Thonburi period.

See also

 Burmese–Siamese wars
 Thonburi Kingdom
 King Taksin the Great

References

Thai generals
Thonburi Kingdom
Phraya
1741 births
1782 deaths
Executed Thai people
People executed by Thailand by decapitation